Culladia cuneiferellus is a species of the family Crambidae in the genus Culladia. It was described by Francis Walker in 1863. It is found in Australia (Queensland, New South Wales and Tasmania), New Caledonia, Norfolk Island, the New Hebrides and the Loyalty Islands. It is also present in New Zealand.

The wingspan is about 10 mm. The forewings are pale brown with two dark chevrons.

The larvae feed on various grasses, including Cynodon dactylon and are considered a pest on lawns and pastures.

References

Moths described in 1863
Crambini
Moths of Australia
Moths of New Zealand